Front-End Engineering (FEE), or Front-End Engineering Design (FEED), is an engineering design approach used to control project expenses and thoroughly plan a project before a fix bid quote is submitted. It may also be referred to as Pre-project planning (PPP), front-end loading (FEL), feasibility analysis, or early project planning.

Overview
The FEED is basic engineering, which comes after the Conceptual design or Feasibility study. The FEE design focuses the technical requirements as well as rough investment cost for the project. The FEED can be divided into separate packages covering different portions of the project. The FEED package is used as the basis for bidding the Execution Phase Contracts (EPC, EPCI, etc) and is used as the design basis.

A good FEED will reflect all of the client's project-specific requirements and avoid significant changes during the execution phase. FEED contracts usually take around 1 year to complete for larger-sized projects. During the FEED phase, there is close communication between Project Owners and Operators and the Engineering Contractor to work up the project-specific requirements.

Front-End Engineering focuses on technical requirements and identifying main costs for a proposed project. It is used to establish a price for the execution phase of the project and evaluate potential risks. It is typically followed by Detailed Design (or Detailed Engineering).  The amount of time invested in Front-End Engineering is higher than a traditional quote, because project specifications are thoroughly extracted, and the following typically developed in detail:

 Project Organization Chart
 Project Scope
 Defined civil, mechanical and chemical engineering
 HAZOP, safety and ergonomic studies
 2D & 3D preliminary models
 Equipment layout and installation plan
 Engineering design package development
 Major equipment list
 Automation strategy
 PFD – Process Flow Diagrams and P&ID – Piping and Instrumentation Diagram
 Project timeline
 Fixed-bid quote

Traditionally, all of these documents would be developed in detail during a design review after a quote has been agreed to. A company using FEED will develop these materials before submitting a quote.

Front-end engineering is typically used by design/build engineering firms. These firms may operate in various industries, including:
 Automation
 Process Industry
 Chemical processing
 Construction
 EPC
 EPCIC
 Equipment design
 Manufacturing
 Pharmaceuticals
 Petrochemicals
 Process system design
 Production line design
 Refining
 Machine Vision

FEE Methodology
FEE Methodology:
FEE is a way of looking at a project before completing detailed design. There is no set way to conduct a Front-End Engineering study. Generally, FEE requires an engineer or a group of engineers to thoroughly and logically consider a proposed project. Example considerations may include:
 Degree of automation – depending on the application being considered, automation may or may not be appropriate. Determining the amount of automation in the project will help determine equipment, labor costs, layout, and design. 
 Rates and levels – to hit a certain rate or level of, for example, production, a certain amount of equipment, materials, and automation may be required. Determining key rates and parameters will have great effect on overall project costs and timeline
 Material specifications – Not all materials work well together, or can withstand the physical application. A basic engineering discipline is determining materials of construction, material compatibility etc. 
 Standards and guidelines – every industry has standards and guidelines, and many industries are regulated. Any equipment, production facilities, manufacturing lines etc. developed for these industries must meet these standards and regulations and can have major impact on costs/time to project completion
 Assumptions, Exclusions, and potential problems: FEE seeks to identify potential problems, assumptions or exclusions that could affect the project during execution. Identifying these during the front-end planning stage so they can be accounted for is the goal of FEE.
Feed also includes the outline and stages of Expansions to happen in future, although the timeline is not specifically stated for such expansions. In such cases, the plot area allocated for expansion at certain stage is usually not transgressed.

References

Cost engineering